Wyatt Sanford (born November 3, 1998) is a Canadian amateur boxer. Sanford competes in the 69 kg weight category (welterweight).

Career
In 2019, Sanford competed at the 2019 AIBA World Boxing Championships. Sanford finished in the top 16, losing to the eventual gold medalist Andrey Zamkovoy of Russia in round 3.

In June 2021, Sanford was named to Canada's 2020 Olympic team. Sanford qualified as the highest ranked boxer from the Americas not yet qualified.

At the 2022 Pan American Championships in Ecuador, went down a category to the 63.5 kg event, winning bronze.

In May 2022, Sanford was named to Canada's 2022 Commonwealth Games team.

Personal life
Sanford is engaged to Canadian Olympic diver Pamela Ware.

References

External links
 

1998 births
Canadian male boxers
Living people
Boxers at the 2020 Summer Olympics
Olympic boxers of Canada
Sportspeople from Nova Scotia
People from Hants County, Nova Scotia
Welterweight boxers
20th-century Canadian people
21st-century Canadian people
Boxers at the 2022 Commonwealth Games
Commonwealth Games bronze medallists for Canada
Commonwealth Games medallists in boxing
Medallists at the 2022 Commonwealth Games